Asha Jaquilla Degree (born August 5, 1990) went missing at the age of nine from Shelby, North Carolina, United States. In the early morning hours of February 14, 2000, for reasons unknown, she packed her bookbag, left her family home north of the city and began walking along nearby North Carolina Highway 18 despite heavy rain and wind. Several passing motorists saw her; when one turned around at a point  from her home and began to approach her, she left the roadside and ran into a wooded area. In the morning, her parents discovered her missing from her bedroom. No one has seen her since.

An intensive search that began that day led to the location of some of her personal effects near where she was last seen. A year and a half later, her bookbag, still packed, was unearthed from a construction site along Highway 18 north of Shelby in Morganton. At the point where she ran into the woods, a billboard now stands appealing for help finding her. Her family hosts an annual walk from their home to the billboard to draw attention to the case.

While the circumstances of Degree's disappearance at first seemed to suggest she was running away from home, investigators could not find a clear reason she might have done so, and she was younger than most children who do. Years after her disappearance, it was concluded by authorities that Degree had been abducted following her leaving the home. The case has drawn national media attention. In 2015, the Federal Bureau of Investigation (FBI) joined state and county authorities in a reopened investigation, offering a reward for information that could help solve the case.

Background 
Harold and Iquilla Degree married on Valentine's Day in 1988. Their son, O'Bryant, was born a year later; Asha was born in 1990.  The Degrees raised both children in their house on Oakcrest Drive in a residential subdivision amidst a generally rural area north of Shelby, North Carolina, on the western edge of the Charlotte metropolitan area. Both worked regular jobs nearby. The children let themselves in after school, where their parents expected that they would either be doing their homework or finished with it by the time they returned.

They made sure their children were insulated from outside influences and had a life centered around their extended family, church, and school. The Degrees did not have a computer in the house.  time you turned on the TV there was some pedophile who had lured somebody's child away, via the Internet," Iquilla recalled in a 2013 Jet interview. Iquilla said Asha handled this well; she was cautious, shy, and content mostly to stay within the limits her parents set. "She was scared to death of dogs," she recalled years later. "I never thought she would go out of the house."

Asha was in fourth grade at nearby Fallston Elementary School, going into a three-day weekend on the second week of February 2000. The Cleveland County Schools were closed on Friday, February 11, while the Degrees still had to work; the children spent the day at their aunt's house in the same neighborhood, from which they went to their youth basketball practices at their school. The following day, Asha's basketball team, on which she was a star point guard, lost its first game of the season. Asha had fouled out. Her parents recalled that she was somewhat upset about this, crying along with her teammates afterwards, but seemed to have gotten over it and watched her brother's game afterwards.

Disappearance 
On February 13, a Sunday, the children went to church from a relative's house and then returned home. Around 8 p.m. that night, both children went to bed in the room they shared. Almost an hour later, the power went out in the neighborhood after a nearby car accident. The power came back on at 12:30 a.m., at which time Harold checked on his children and saw both Asha and O'Bryant asleep in their beds. He checked again shortly before he went to bed at 2:30 a.m. on February 14 and again saw them both.

Shortly afterwards, O'Bryant, then age 10, recalls hearing Asha's bed squeak. He did not further rouse himself, as he assumed she was merely changing positions in her sleep. Apparently around this time, Asha got out of bed, taking a bookbag she had previously packed with several sets of clothes and personal items, and left the house. Between 3:45 and 4:15 a.m., a truck driver and a motorist saw her walking south along Highway 18, wearing a long-sleeved white T-shirt and white pants, just north of its junction with Highway 180. They reported this to police after seeing a TV report about her disappearance. The motorist said that he turned his car around because he thought it was "strange such a small child would be out by herself at that hour". He circled three times and saw Degree run into the woods by the roadside and disappear. It was a rainy night, and the witness said there was a "storm raging" when he saw her. County sheriff Dan Crawford said, "We're pretty sure it was her because the descriptions they gave are consistent with what we know she was wearing." He added that they also saw her at the same place, heading the same direction.

Iquilla awoke at 5:45 a.m. to get the children ready for school. That morning, this involved drawing a bath for them because they had not been able to take one the night before due to the power outage. When she opened the children's room to wake them up before their 6:30 alarm and call them to the bath, O'Bryant was in his bed; Asha was not, and Iquilla was unable to find her in the house or in the family cars. She told Harold she could not find their daughter. He suggested Asha might have gone over to his mother's house across the street; when Iquilla called there, her sister-in-law said Asha was not there. "That's when I went into panic mode. I heard a car next door ... I put shoes on and ran outside." Iquilla called her mother, who told her to call the police.

Search 
By 6:40 a.m., the first police officers had arrived on the scene. Police dogs called to the scene could not pick up Asha's scent. Iquilla went through the neighborhood calling Asha's name, which she said had awakened everyone by 7 a.m. Friends, family, and neighbors canceled their plans for the day to assist police in searching the vicinity while the pastor of their church, along with other area clergymen, came to the Degrees' home to support them. By day's end, all that had been found was a mitten, which Iquilla Degree said did not belong to her daughter, noting that no winter clothing had been taken from the house. Local news coverage prompted the two drivers who had seen Asha walking along the road early that morning, including the one whose attempt to approach her apparently prompted Asha to flee into the woods, to report the sightings to police.

On February 15, candy wrappers were found in a shed at a nearby business along the highway, near where Asha had been seen running into the woods. Along with them were a pencil, marker, and Mickey Mouse-shaped hair bow that were identified as belonging to her. Also found was a photograph of a Black girl around Asha's age who has yet to be identified. It was the only trace of her found during the initial search. On February 16, Iquilla realized that Asha's bedroom was missing her favorite clothing, including a pair of blue jeans with a red stripe. "We have never really had that first good, substantial lead," said county sheriff Dan Crawford at a news conference. He urged the media to keep the story alive.

Later developments 
At the news conference on February 22, 2000, Crawford said he was going "long-range" with the search for Asha. Both the FBI and North Carolina's State Bureau of Investigation (SBI) got involved and put her on their respective databases of missing children. While the agencies were done searching in the area of her home and route, "we're following everything," he insisted.

From Iquilla's account of what Asha had taken with her, investigators believed she had planned and prepared for this departure over the several days preceding her disappearance. "She's not your typical runaway," observed SBI agent Bart Burpeau. Another expert, Ben Ermini of the National Center for Missing & Exploited Children, noted that most children who run away are at least 12. An FBI agent also pointed to the lack of an issue she might have been running away from, such as a dysfunctional family or poor academic performance. Still, investigators believed that was the most likely explanation for her departure, but that for some reason, she either got off track or was abducted.

The media attention went national. A month after Asha's disappearance, the Degree family appeared on The Montel Williams Show to call attention to the case. America's Most Wanted and The Oprah Winfrey Show also devoted segments to it.

It was wrapped in a plastic bag. The worker who found it said the bookbag contained Asha's name and phone number. The FBI took it to their headquarters for further forensic analysis; results from that testing have not been shared publicly. To date, it is the last evidence found in the case. On the 20th anniversary of Asha's disappearance, the FBI confirmed that the bookbag contained a copy of Dr. Seuss's McElligot's Pool and a T-shirt depicting the band New Kids on the Block. Neither appeared to have been her property before they were found in her bag; the book was from the library at her elementary school.

Later leads have turned out to be dead ends. In 2004, acting on a tip reportedly received from an inmate at the county jail, the sheriff's office began digging at an intersection in Lawndale. The bones that were found turned out to be from an animal.

The Degrees took steps to keep Asha's memory, and the case, alive in the public's mind. In 2008, they established a scholarship in her name for a deserving local student. They host an annual walk to raise awareness and money to fund their search. The walk starts at their home and ends at a missing person's billboard for Asha along Highway 18, near where she was last seen. It was originally held on February 14, but it was changed to February 7 in 2015 and February 6 in 2016, as Harold and Iquilla felt it was not fair to participants to make Valentine's Day a somber occasion. Pictures of Asha, both real and those showing her as she might appear in later years created by investigators to help the search, still decorate the Degree house. "I fully expect her to walk through the door," Iquilla says.

Iquilla Degree lamented in a 2013 interview with Jet that her daughter's disappearance had not gotten as much media attention over the years as some subsequent cases of missing children because Asha was Black. "Missing white children get more attention. I don't understand why," she said. "I know if you ask them they will say it's not racial. Oh, really? I'm not going to argue because I have common sense."

In February 2015, the FBI announced that FBI agents, Cleveland County Sheriff's Office investigators, and State Bureau of Investigation agents were re-examining the case and re-interviewing witnesses. They also announced a reward of up to $25,000 for "information leading to the arrest and conviction of the person or persons responsible for her disappearance." A community group is offering an additional $20,000 reward.

The FBI announced 15 months later, in May 2016, that their reinvestigation of the case had turned up a possible new lead. They disclosed that Asha may have been seen getting into a dark green early 1970s Lincoln Continental Mark IV, or possibly a Ford Thunderbird from the same era, along Route 18 near where she was last seen later that night. It was described as having rust around its wheel wells.

In September 2017, the FBI announced that its Child Abduction Rapid Deployment (CARD) team was in Cleveland County to assist in the investigation and "provide on-the-ground investigative, technical, behavioral analysis, and analytical support to find out more about what happened to Asha". The team worked alongside FBI Charlotte employees, Cleveland County Sheriff's Office investigators, and North Carolina State Bureau of Investigation agents for ten days. The agencies also meet "several times a month to go over the latest on the investigation." Since September 2017, local agents and investigators have conducted approximately 300 interviews.

In October 2018, the Cleveland County Sheriff's Office detectives appealed for information from the public about two items of interest that were found in Degree's bookbag: McElligot's Pool, a children's book by Dr. Seuss, which was borrowed from the Fallston Elementary School library in early 2000, and a New Kids on the Block concert T-shirt. An investigator said the items are vital clues.

In November 2020, an inmate named Marcus Mellon, who was convicted of sex crimes against children in 2014, wrote a letter to The Shelby Star, claiming that Degree was murdered and he knows where to find her. In February 2021, Cleveland County Sheriff Alan Norman announced that Mellon's claims had led to another dead end.

See also 

 List of people who disappeared

References

External links 
 
 
 

2000 in North Carolina
2000s missing person cases
Cleveland County, North Carolina
February 2000 events in the United States
Missing American children
Missing person cases in North Carolina